Bigra is a village in Bhatar CD block in Bardhaman Sadar North subdivision of Purba Bardhaman district in the state of West Bengal, India with total 434 families residing.

History
Census 2011 Bigra Village Location Code or Village Code 319772. The village of Bigra is located in the Bhatar tehsil of Burdwan district in West Bengal, India.

Transport 

Population 
Bigra village of Barddhaman has substantial population of Schedule Caste. Schedule Caste (SC) constitutes 31.40% while Schedule Tribe (ST) were 14.17% of total population in Bigra village.

Population and house data

Healthcare
Nearest Rural Hospital at Bhatar (with 60 beds) is the main medical facility in Bhatar CD block. There are primary health centers..

School
BIGRA BAMUNIA IMP. F.P. SCHOOL.

References 

Villages in Purba Bardhaman district
West Bengal articles missing geocoordinate data